Tumak is a rural locality (a khutor) in Kletskoye Rural Settlement, Sredneakhtubinsky District, Volgograd Oblast, Russia. The population was 279 as of 2010. There are 4 streets.

Geography 
Tumak is located 37 km southwest of Srednyaya Akhtuba (the district's administrative centre) by road. Pryshchevka is the nearest rural locality.

References 

Rural localities in Sredneakhtubinsky District